Paniker is a surname. Notable people with the surname include:

Ayyappa Paniker (1930–2006), Indian poet, literary critic, academic, and scholar
K. C. S. Paniker (1911–1977), Indian painter

See also
Panicker

Indian surnames